Kenneth Scott (born 13 August 1931) was an English professional footballer who played in the Football League for Derby County and Mansfield Town.

References

1931 births
Living people
English footballers
Association football forwards
English Football League players
Derby County F.C. players
Mansfield Town F.C. players
Denaby United F.C. players